Khalteh (also Romanized as Khalţeh, and Khelţeh; also known as Khalīfeh-ye Qadīm, Khalīteh, Khaltak, and Khalte) is a village in Shamsabad Rural District, in the Central District of Dezful County, Khuzestan Province, Iran. At the 2006 census, its population was 320, in 79 families.

References 

Populated places in Dezful County